An inspection locomotive was a special type of steam locomotive designed to carry railroad officials on inspection tours of the railroad property.

Background 
These were fitted with passenger car-like bodywork and seating. Many railroads in the nineteenth century owned one, but their use dwindled in the twentieth century. They were replaced with converted passenger-car inspection cars, or HiRail trucks, automobiles fitted with steel flanged wheels.

Some were especially built for this service, while others were rebuilt from obsolete locomotives. Many were quite small; the locomotive pictured is in fact one of the largest and most modern inspection locomotives ever constructed. They were generally well cared for and highly decorated.

History by country

Brazil 
In 1928, the Leopoldina Railway (de) purchased an inspection steam railcar by Sentinel Waggon Works.

China
In 1907, the South Manchuria Railway in Manchuria (today northeastern China) bought two inspection locomotives built by Baldwin Locomotive Works. An engine of the same class was delivered to Rochester & Pittsburg Coal & Iron Company in 1903.

Peru 

The 3 ft narrow gauge Chimbote Railway (de) had an inspection locomotive built 1880 by Baldwin Locomotive Works. The special feature was that it was equipped with a sleeping compartment.

Russia 
The Russian Railways still has two inspection locomotives A ChS2 540 & 549, which are converted electric locomotives of the ChS2 series. Since 2018, A ChS2 549 has been in the museum at the Moskovsky Rail Terminal.

United Kingdom 

Railway companies in the United Kingdom rarely used inspection locomotives. Instead dedicated carriages (known as Inspection Saloons) were used. These were either rebuilt from obsolete coach stock or, occasionally, were newly built. However many companies maintained dedicated locomotives to haul Inspection Saloons. These were usually elderly engines that had been famous top-rank express locomotives when new but had since been surpassed. Examples of such engines include the Caledonian Railway Single, LNWR No.3020 'Cornwall' and NER No. 66 'Aerolite'.

Dugald Drummond, when Chief Mechanical Engineer of the London and South Western Railway had a small 4–2–4 tank locomotive called LSWR F9 class with a small saloon body mounted on its rear to serve as his personal transport around the L&SWR system on inspections and visits.

The Edinburgh and Glasgow Railway (E&GR) also had an inspection locomotive built in 1856. On 1 August 1865 the North British Railway absorbed the E&GR. The engine got the No. 312, in 1895 No. 879, in 1901 No. 1079. It was withdrawn 1911.

In 1890, the London, Brighton and South Coast Railway built an inspection locomotive called Inspector. It was withdrawn in 1899.

United States 
By 1900, many railroads in the United States had inspection locomotives. A few examples:

The only known surviving U.S. example is the Reading Railroad's "Black Diamond", a tiny 2-2-2 with fully enclosed bodywork, at the National Museum of Transportation in St. Louis, Missouri. It was used by the President of Philadelphia & Reading Coal and Iron Co. and other railroad executives on short business or inspection trips.

References

External links 

Locomotives
Maintenance of way equipment
Steam locomotive types
Locomotive body styles